Kamla Devi Patle (born 5 May 1966) is an Indian politician. She was a Member of Parliament, representing the Janjgir (Lok Sabha constituency) in the state of Chhattisgarh. She was elected to the 15th Lok Sabha in 2009 by defeating Dr. Shivkumar Dahariya of Indian National Congress by 87,211 votes and got re-elected to 16th Lok Sabha in 2014.

References

1966 births
Living people
India MPs 2009–2014
Women in Chhattisgarh politics
Lok Sabha members from Chhattisgarh
India MPs 2014–2019
People from Janjgir-Champa district
Bharatiya Janata Party politicians from Chhattisgarh
21st-century Indian women politicians
21st-century Indian politicians
Women members of the Lok Sabha